Cryptogramma stelleri, common names slender cliff-brake, fragile rock-brake, slender rock-brake, and Steller's rockbrake, is a plant found in North America. It is listed as endangered in Connecticut,  Massachusetts, New Jersey, and Pennsylvania. It is listed as threatened in Maine and New Hampshire, as exploitably vulnerable in New York (state) and as sensitive in Washington (state). 

Cryptogramma stelleri is known to be able to use artificial light to grow in places which are otherwise devoid of natural light, such as Crystal Cave in Wisconsin.

References

Pteridaceae